Matías Moldskred Belli (born 12 August 1997) is a professional footballer who plays as a midfielder for Norgewian First Division club Sandnes Ulf. Born in Spain, he represents the Nicaragua national team.

Early life
Moldskred was born on 12 August 1997 in Madrid, Spain, to a Norwegian father and a Nicaraguan mother. In addition to the Norwegian language, he also speaks Spanish.

Moldskred lived in Belgium for three years before moving to Bærum in 2005.

Moldskred is the nephew of the poet Gioconda Belli, sister of his mother Lavinia.

Club career
Raised in the Ullern youth academies, Moldskred later joined the Asker youth academies. He made his first team debut on 17 October 2015, replacing Stian Solberg in a 0–8 win at Grue. The following year he moved to Bærum, but he didn't play any team games.

In view of the 2017 championship, Moldskred has been registered by IF Ready. On 19 April, he played his first match in 3. divisjon, in a 5–1 victory over Raufoss 2. On 29 April he scored the first goal, in a 4–2 win over Redalen.

On 9 January 2018, Raufoss announced the signing of Moldskred, who has joined the new club with a two-year contract. On 14 April 2018 he made his debut in 2. divisjon, used as a starter in the 4–0 win over Elverum. On 22 April he scored his first goals in the league, scoring a brace in the 0–5 victory at Nybergsund. At the end of that same season, Raufoss was promoted to 1. divisjon.

On 31 March 2019, Moldskred therefore played his first match in the Norwegian second division, when he was deployed in the 1–2 win at Nest-Sotra, in which he scored a goal.

On 19 January 2021, Moldskred's move to the Start was announced, for which he signed a three-year agreement.

International career
On 13 March 2021, Moldskred received the first call-up from Nicaragua's coach Juan Vita of Argentina in view of the 2022 World Cup qualifying matches to be played on March 24 and 27, respectively against St. Lucia and Turks and Caicos Islands.

St. Lucia had withdrawn from the World Cup qualifying, so Moldskred then made his debut on 27 March, taking over from Danilo Zúñiga and scoring a goal in the 0–7 victory over Turks and Caicos Islands.

According to Vita, Moldskred is a «midfielder with attacking characteristics and with a very good proactive ability. He has a good shot from mid-range, he is good in the air and from a tactical point of view».

International goals
Scores and results list Nicaragua's goal tally first.

References

1997 births
Living people
People with acquired Nicaraguan citizenship
Nicaraguan men's footballers
Association football midfielders
Nicaragua international footballers
Nicaraguan people of Norwegian descent
People with acquired Norwegian citizenship
Norwegian men's footballers
Asker Fotball players
Raufoss IL players
IK Start players
Norwegian First Division players
Norwegian people of Nicaraguan descent
Footballers from Madrid
Spanish expatriates in Belgium